During the 2001–02 English football season, Blackburn Rovers competed in the Premier League (known as the FA Barclaycard Premiership for sponsorship reasons).

Season summary
Blackburn won just four of their first 14 league games, a run which also included seven draws and three defeats. However, they had little time to savour their Worthington Cup glory that resulted from a 2–1 win over Tottenham Hotspur on 24 February - they were deep in the relegation mire and occupying third place from bottom following a dreadful winter period, as they won two and lost ten in 12 games, the two wins seeing them do a decidedly one-sided double over Charlton Athletic (2–0 away and 4–1 home). But Graeme Souness inspired his side, bolstered by the arrival of striker Andy Cole, to a considerable turnaround in form - seeing them win six in their final 12 games - which saw them climb to 10th place in the final table. UEFA Cup qualification had already been achieved thanks to the Worthington Cup triumph, but the club's fans were left wondering whether it could have been achieved automatically had it not been for the club's dismal winter period. Especially, their league record produced four more defeats than wins in contrast to a final goal difference of +4, concluding them as a comprehensively winning team despite their inconsistency.

At the end of the season, striker Mark Hughes retired at the age of 38, after a playing career spanning 22 years that had yielded two league titles, four FA Cups, a Cup Winners' Cup and three League Cups.

Final league table

Results summary

Results by round

Results
Blackburn Rovers' score comes first

Legend

FA Premier League

FA Cup

League Cup

First-team squad
Squad at end of season

Left club during season

Reserve squad

Statistics

Appearances and goals

|-
! colspan=12 style=background:#dcdcdc; text-align:center| Goalkeepers

|-
! colspan=12 style=background:#dcdcdc; text-align:center| Defenders

|-
! colspan=12 style=background:#dcdcdc; text-align:center| Midfielders

|-
! colspan=12 style=background:#dcdcdc; text-align:center| Forwards

|-
! colspan=12 style=background:#dcdcdc; text-align:center| Left club during season

|}

Top scorers

Premier League
  Matt Jansen 10
  Andy Cole 9
  Damien Duff 7
  David Dunn 6
  Craig Hignett 4

Football League Cup Final line-up

|valign="top"|

Notes

References

Blackburn Rovers
Blackburn Rovers F.C. seasons